Alberto Murguia Orozco (born 1955) is a Mexican businessman and politician. He is best identified as a partner of Jorge Hank Rhon in Grupo Caliente, one of Latin America's largest gaming corporations. Murguia first became elected to public office in 2006, when he was elected as a federal supplemental senator for the Partido Revolucionario Institucional.  He is also the co-owner of the Mexican professional soccer team Club Tijuana.

References

Institutional Revolutionary Party politicians
Living people
1955 births